Tasbih is a form of dhikr that involves the glorification of Allah in Islam by saying: "Subhan Allah" (lit. "Glory be to God").

It is often repeated a certain number of times, using either the phalanges of the right hand or a misbaha to keep track of counting.

Etymology
The term tasbeeh is based on in the Arabic root of sīn-bāʾ-ḥāʾ (--). The meaning of the root word when written means to glorify. 'Tasbeeh' is an irregular derivation from subhan, which is the first word of the constitutive sentence of the first third of the canonical form (see below) of tasbeeh. The word literally means, as a verb, "to travel swiftly" and, as a noun, "duties" or "occupation". However, in the devotional context, tasbih refers to Subhan Allah, which is often used in the Qur'an with the preposition ʿan, meaning "God is devoid [of what they (polytheists) attribute to Him]" (Al-Tawba: 31, Al-Zumar: 67 et al.). Without this preposition, it means something like "Glory be to God."

Interpretation
The phrase translates to "Glory be to God" but a more literal translation is, "God is above [all things]". The root of the word subḥān is derived from the word sabaḥa ("to be above"), giving the phrase a meaning that God is above any imperfection or false descriptions.

The phrase often has the connotation of praising God for his total perfection, implying a rejection of any anthropomorphic elements or associations with God, or any attribution of mistakes or faults to him. Thus, it serves as testimony to God's transcendence (tanzīh).

For example, the Quran says subḥāna llāhi ʿammā yaṣifūn ("God is above that which they describe") and subḥāna llāhi ʿammā yušrikūn ("God is above that which they associate with him").

The phrase is mentioned in the hadiths of Sahih Bukhari, VBN 5, 57, 50.

Variants
Various Islamic phrases include the Tasbih, most commonly:

Usage
It is also often cited during the Islamic prayer (salat), supplication (dua), during a sermon (khutba) in the mosque and commonly throughout the day. It is sometimes used to express shock or amazement.

Muslims are also encouraged to say the phrase 33 times after prayer and throughout the day. Muhammad taught Muslims that it is one of the four praises that God likes Muslims to say continuously.

Fatimah bint Muhammad

In the early years of the marriage of Ali and Fatimah, Ali earned very little money and was unable to afford a servant for Fatimah. Fatimah's hands were blistered from constant grinding; her neck had become sore from carrying water; her clothes had become dirty from sweeping the floor.
One day Ali was aware that Muhammad had some servants, and advised Fatimah to ask him for one of his servants. Fatimah went, but she was unable to ask. Finally, Ali went with Fatimah to Muhammad's house. He did not accept their request, saying "there are many orphans (starved), I must sell these servants to feed them".
Then Muhammad said "I will give you one thing better than helping of servant". He taught them a special manner of Dhikr which is known as the "tasbih of Fatimah".
 34 repetitions of ʾallāhu ʾakbar, meaning "God is Greater [than everything]". This saying is known as Takbir.
 33 repetitions of al-ḥamdu lillāh, meaning "All praise is due to God.". This saying is known as Tahmid.
 33 repetitions of subḥāna -llah, meaning "Glorified is God". This saying is known as Tasbih.

See also
Tasbih of Fatimah
Tahmid
Al-hamdu lillahi rabbil 'alamin
Tahlil
Takbir
Tasmiyah
Salawat
Peace be upon him
Shahadah
Hallelujah

References

Further reading
  Dubin, L. S. (2009). "Prayer Beads". In C. Kenney (Ed.), The History of Beads: From 100,000 B.C. to the Present. Revised and Expanded Edition. New York: Abrams Publishing. pp. 79–92.
  Henry, G., & Marriott, S. (2008). Beads of Faith: Pathways to Meditation and Spirituality Using Rosaries, Prayer Beads and Sacred Words. Fons Vitae Publishing.
  Untracht, O. (2008). "Rosaries of India". In H. Whelchel (ed.), Traditional Jewelry of India. New York: Thames & Hudson. pp. 69–73.
  Wiley, E., & Shannon, M. O. (2002). A String and a Prayer: How to Make and Use Prayer Beads. Red Wheel/Weiser, LLC.

External links
 History of Prayer Beads: Islamic Subha
 History of the Tasbih in Iran
 History of the Tasbih in Iran
 Muslim Prayer Beads
 Rosaries of India: Muslim Misbaha
 Souvenir Tasbih Cantik

Prayer beads
Salah
Salah terminology
Arabic words and phrases
Islamic terminology
Sunni Islam
Shia Islam